Ostrów (Polish for "river island") may refer to:

Places

Poland
 Greater Poland Voivodeship
 Ostrów Wielkopolski, a town in Greater Poland Voivodeship (west-central Poland)
 Ostrów, Greater Poland Voivodeship in Greater Poland Voivodeship (west-central Poland)

 Kuyavian-Pomeranian Voivodeship
 Ostrów, Brodnica County in Kuyavian-Pomeranian Voivodeship (north-central Poland)
 Ostrów, Tuchola County in Kuyavian-Pomeranian Voivodeship (north-central Poland)

 Lesser Poland Voivodeship
 Ostrów, Proszowice County in Lesser Poland Voivodeship (south Poland)
 Ostrów, Tarnów County in Lesser Poland Voivodeship (south Poland)

 Lublin Voivodship
 Ostrów Lubelski, a town in Lublin Voivodship (east Poland)
 Ostrów, Biała Podlaska County in Lublin Voivodeship (east Poland)
 Ostrów, Gmina Dorohusk in Lublin Voivodeship (east Poland)
 Ostrów, Gmina Wojsławice in Lublin Voivodeship (east Poland)
 Ostrów, Kraśnik County in Lublin Voivodeship (east Poland)
 Ostrów, Tomaszów Lubelski County in Lublin Voivodeship (east Poland)
 Ostrów, Lubartów County in Lublin Voivodeship (east Poland)

 Lubusz Voivodeship
 Ostrów, Lubusz Voivodeship in Lubusz Voivodeship (west Poland)

 Łódź Voivodeship
 Ostrów, Łask County in Łódź Voivodeship (central Poland)
 Ostrów, Łowicz County in Łódź Voivodeship (central Poland)
 Ostrów, Opoczno County in Łódź Voivodeship (central Poland)
 Ostrów, Gmina Aleksandrów in Łódź Voivodeship (central Poland)
 Ostrów, Gmina Grabica in Łódź Voivodeship (central Poland)
 Ostrów, Sieradz County in Łódź Voivodeship (central Poland)
 Ostrów, Gmina Ozorków in Łódź Voivodeship (central Poland)
 Ostrów, Gmina Zgierz in Łódź Voivodeship (central Poland)

 Masovian Voivodeship
 Ostrów, Garwolin County in Masovian Voivodeship (east-central Poland)
 Ostrów, Kozienice County in Masovian Voivodeship (east-central Poland)
 Ostrów, Mława County in Masovian Voivodeship (east-central Poland)
 Ostrów, Otwock County in Masovian Voivodeship (east-central Poland)
 Ostrów, Sierpc County in Masovian Voivodeship (east-central Poland)
 Ostrów Mazowiecka, a town in Masovian Voivodship (east-central Poland)

 Podlaskie Voivodeship
 Ostrów, Gmina Poświętne in Podlaskie Voivodeship (north-east Poland)
 Ostrów, Gmina Suraż in Podlaskie Voivodeship (north-east Poland)

 Silesian Voivodeship
 Ostrów, Lubliniec County in Silesian Voivodeship (south Poland)
 Ostrów, Myszków County in Silesian Voivodeship (south Poland)

 Subcarpathian Voivodeship
 Ostrów, Przemyśl County in Subcarpathian Voivodeship (south-east Poland)
 Ostrów, Jarosław County in Subcarpathian Voivodeship (south-east Poland)
 Ostrów, Przeworsk County in Subcarpathian Voivodeship (south-east Poland)
 Ostrów, Ropczyce-Sędziszów County in Subcarpathian Voivodeship (south-east Poland)

 Świętokrzyskie Voivodeship
 Ostrów, Busko County in Świętokrzyskie Voivodeship (south-central Poland)
 Ostrów, Opatów County in Świętokrzyskie Voivodeship (south-central Poland)
 Ostrów, Kielce County in Świętokrzyskie Voivodeship (south-central Poland)
 Ostrów, Włoszczowa County in Świętokrzyskie Voivodeship (south-central Poland)

 Warmian-Masurian Voivodeship
 Ostrów, Warmian-Masurian Voivodeship in Warmian-Masurian Voivodeship (north Poland)

 West Pomeranian Voivodeship
 Ostrów, West Pomeranian Voivodeship West Pomeranian Voivodeship (north-west Poland)

Belarus
 Astraviec, town in Belarus
 Vostrava, village in Belarus where the Astrava Treaty was signed

Lithuania
 Astravas, suburb of Biržai, Lithuania

Islands
 Ostrów Island, in Gdańsk
 Ostrów Lednicki, on Lednica Lake
 Ostrów Tumski, Głogów
 Ostrów Tumski, Poznań
 Ostrów Tumski, Wrocław

See also
Ostriv (disambiguation) (Ukrainian form)
Ostrov (disambiguation)
Ostrowo (disambiguation)
Ostrowiec (disambiguation)